Nilo Zandanel (8 November 1937 – 25 July 2015) was an Italian ski jumper.

Career
He competed at the 1960 and 1964 Winter Olympics in the normal and large hill events with the best achievement of 25th place in the large hill in 1964. He was the Olympic flag bearer for Italy at the 1956 Olympics.

On 16 February 1964, he set the ski jumping world record distance at 142 metres (466 ft) on Heini-Klopfer-Skiflugschanze in Oberstdorf, West Germany.

Ski jumping world record

References

External links
 

1937 births
2015 deaths
Ski jumpers at the 1960 Winter Olympics
Ski jumpers at the 1964 Winter Olympics
Olympic ski jumpers of Italy
Italian male ski jumpers